The 2006 American Basketball Association All-Star Game was held in Sunrise, Florida at the 20,737 seat BankAtlantic Center on February 11, 2006, where East defeated West, 129–127. Former NBA player Armen Gilliam who came out of retirement in 2005 to play for the Pittsburgh Xplosion, was named the Most Valuable Player, though the main attraction of the All-Star Game was Tim Hardaway who had already participated in 5 NBA All-Star Games in his career. Prior to the game, Randy Gill won the 3-Point Shootout, and Ray Cunningham won the Slam Dunk Contest. Both teams were coached by former NBA players. The East team was coached by Greg Graham of the Indiana Alley Cats, while the West team was coached Gary Grant of the SoCal Legends. Chinese players Huang Haibei and Sun Yue of Beijing Aoshen Olympian were the only non-Americans of the event.

The Game
Minutes after the start of the game the West All-Stars found themselves down 20-4 and the East All-Stars maintained the wide margin throughout the first half and early into the second half. East held a 23-point lead at 88–65 with six minutes left in the third quarter. West All-Stars led by Caleb Gervin outscored the East 32–15 in the remainder of the third quarter which finished 103–99.The East and West played even through the fourth quarter, with the West still leading by seven, 127–120 with two minutes left in the game. The East then went on a 9–0 run over the next 1:23 to regain the lead at 129–127 with 37 seconds left and this remained until the end of the game as Caleb Gervin missed his game-winning three-point attempt at the buzzer. Former NBA player Armen Gilliam of the Pittsburgh Xplosion was named the MVP of the game with 29 points.

All-Star Teams

Rosters

Former NBA players
 Tim Hardaway
 Armon Gilliam
 Lawrence Moten
 Greg Graham
 Gary Grant

See also

2007 ABA All-Star Game

References

External links
ABALive.com/AllStar  - Official website of the 2006 ABA All-Star Game

ABA All-Star Games
2005–06 in American basketball